The Swedish Senior Citizen Interest Party (Sveriges pensionärers intresseparti, SPI Välfärden) is a political party in Sweden. As of 2018, it holds no seats in parliament or regional councils, but is represented in Hörby municipal council. The party did not campaign on the national level in the 2018 election. The current party chairman is Göran Dandelo.

References

Political parties established in 1987
Minor political parties in Sweden
Pensioners' parties
1987 establishments in Sweden